Andrea Cantelmo (2 August 1598 – 5 November 1645) was a Neapolitan commander of Habsburg armies during the Thirty Years' War, the War of the Mantuan Succession, the second phase of the Eighty Years' War and the Franco-Spanish War (1635–59).

Life
Cantelmo, son of the duke of Popoli and of Laura d'Evoli, was born in Pettorano sul Gizio on 2 August 1598. In 1620 he obtained a commission as captain of a company of arquebusiers being sent to the Valtelline. After serving in the Valtelline he transferred to the army of Emperor Ferdinand II as a cavalry commander, serving in Bohemia before returning to Italy to take part in the Relief of Genoa. He remained in Italy to serve in the initial stages of the War of the Mantuan Succession, taking part in the Siege of Casale.

In 1631 he transferred again, to the Army of Flanders, serving in the Rhineland and later in Picardy. As general of artillery he played an important role in the Habsburg victory in the Battle of Kallo (1638). He was interested in history and politics, and wrote on the art of war, but his writings have not been preserved. He maintained a correspondence with the humanist historian Erycius Puteanus.

By 1644 he was in Spain, where he was appointed a member of the Council of War and given command of the Army of Catalonia as acting captain general (substituting for Felipe de Silva).

He died at Alcubierre on 5 November 1645.

References

Bibliography
 Lionardo Di Capua, Vita di Andrea Cantelmo (Naples, Giacomo Raillard, 1693). Copy from National Central Library (Rome) available on Google Books. Accessed 14 Feb. 2015.

1598 births
1645 deaths
Military personnel of the Eighty Years' War
Italian military writers
Military personnel of the Thirty Years' War